Kenny Neil (born January 8, 1959) is an American former professional American football player, who played defensive lineman for the New York Jets and Houston Oilers.

References

1959 births
American football defensive linemen
New York Jets players
Houston Oilers players
Iowa State Cyclones football players
Living people
National Football League replacement players